John Costas, born  Ioannis Papakostas (1868–1932), was a Greek revolutionary and veteran of the Second Boer War.

Biography

Early life
Ioannis Papakostas was born in 1868 in Lia, a village near the town of Filiates during a period that Epirus was still under Ottoman rule. He was son of a local priest and he emigrated at a young age first to Australia and later to Egypt. In 1898 he arrived in the South African Republic and settled in Johannesburg.

Military action
During the Second Boer War he became a volunteer on the Boers' side and he fought in various battles, including Spion Kop and Paardeberg. He was taken prisoner after the Boers were defeated. During his captivity, Costas was taken to POW camps in British Ceylon.

In 1903 he was released and returned to South Africa, but eight years later he returned to Greece. He settled in Athens where he was initiated into Epirotan Society, an organisation founded in 1906 and led by people of Epirotan descent like Spyros Spyromilios and Panagiotis Danglis for the purpose of liberating Epirus from Ottoman rule and its unification with Greece. During the First Balkan War, Costas fought as a leader of a minor Greek guerilla band in the region of Thesprotia where he faced mainly Cham Albanian irregulars who fought on the Ottoman forces' side. Furthermore, in 1914 he joined the armed forces of the Autonomous Republic of Northern Epirus.

Later life
The following years he remained in Greece and but after the defeat of Eleftherios Venizelos' Liberal Party at the 1920 parliamentary elections Costas, who was a Venizelos supporter, left Greece, returned to South Africa and settled in Stellenbosch where he died in 1932.

Distinctions
For his services to the Greek state, John Costas was honoured with the rank of captain and with a military medal while in 1982 the South African government built a bust in his birthplace, Lia, as a tribute for his participation in the Second Boer War. Moreover, Costas donated an important amount of money for various needs of Lias community.

References

Bibliography
Βασίλη Κραψίτη, Σύγχρονοι Ηπειρώτες ευεργέτες (1913–1986), εκδόσεις του συλλόγου "Οι φίλοι του Σουλίου", Athens, 1987.
E.A. Mantzaris, The Greeks in South Africa, in Richard Clogg (ed.), The Greek Diaspora in the Twentieth Century, Macmillan Press, 1999.

1868 births
1932 deaths
John Costas
Greek military personnel of the Balkan Wars
South African Republic military personnel of the Second Boer War
People from Janina vilayet
South African people of Greek descent
Greek prisoners of war
Prisoners of war held by the United Kingdom
Northern Epirus independence activists
People from Filiates